Andebu is a village in Sandefjord municipality, Vestfold County, and a former municipality. The administrative centre of the municipality was the village of Andebu. The village is surrounded by forests, mountains, and hills. Its nearest cities are Sandefjord and Tønsberg. The parish of Andebo was established as a municipality on 1 January 1838 (see formannskapsdistrikt). On 1 January 2017, the municipality became a part of Sandefjord municipality, along with Stokke. The former municipality now makes up the northernmost part of Sandefjord municipality.

Andebu was the fourth-largest municipality in Vestfold and is situated in the center of the county. Its economy is primarily related to logging and forestry. Andebu has been inhabited for centuries and the oldest artifacts retrieved here dates back 4000 years to the Iron Age. Most retrieved artifacts are various types of tools, mainly axes made of flint and other rocks. Andebu’s geography consists mainly of valleys, hills, mountains, forests, and lakes.

Andebu is home to three Medieval churches. It is home to Norway's oldest parish register, which belongs to Andebu Church and is dated to 1623. Andebu is also the home of Høyjord Stave Church, the only stave church in Vestfold County. Andebu was home to 2,160 residents as of 2016.

General information 

Andebu has large areas of woodland. The main villages are Andebu, Høyjord, and Kodal. The church buildings in all three villages are from the Middle Ages; Kodal Church (Kodal kirke) dates from the 12th century; Høyjord Stave Church (Høyjord Stavkyrkje) was built around 1150–1200.

Name 
The Old Norse form of the name was Andabú. The meaning of the first element is unknown and the last element is bú which means "district".  Prior to 1889, the name was written "Andebo".

Coat-of-arms 
The coat-of-arms is from modern times.  They were granted on 12 December 1986.  The arms show three silver triangles, each for one of the three villages/parishes in the municipality: Andebu, Høyjord, and Kodal. The three triangles also form the letter A, the initial of the municipality.  The colour green represents agriculture and forestry

History 

Various historical artifacts and burial mounds dated to the Viking Age have been discovered in Andebu. Finds include a bronze key, a stone axe, arrows, and more. Burial mounds have been discovered on approximately 30 farms in Andebu, including 17 in Andebu proper, 5 in Høyjord, and 7 in Kodal. Some mounds are dated back as far as 500 BCE, i.e. over a thousand years prior to the Viking Age. Large amounts of burial mounds are found at Nordre Haugan, Nedre Skjelland, Våle, Vestre Høyjord, Bjørndal, and Gjerstad.

The 14th century Black Plague had a devastating impact on Andebu. It is estimated that the population was 600 as of 1600 A.D., approximately the same amount as prior to the plague.

Andebu municipality was established on 1 January 1838, with priest Jens H. Otterbeck as its first mayor. Otterbeck served as mayor for 24 years and was the longest-serving mayor of Andebu.

Geography 

Andebu lies in the interior central parts of Vestfold County. Most of Andebu is forested, but numerous rivers and mountains can also be found in Andebu. Rivers include Merkedamselva, which flows through eastern parts of Høyjord village. Steinselva (Skorgeelva), Bergselva and Bølevannsbekken are other rivers. Lakes include Stålerødvannet, Heievannet, Goksjø, and others. The highest points of the former municipality are in northwestern parts near the village of Høyjord. Some peaks include Brånafjell, which is the tallest peak in Sandefjord municipality, as well as Åletjønnåsen and Storås. Smaller peaks include Bustingen, Skørsåsane, and Storås by Skjeau. The municipality of Andebu was home to 35 lakes, including Askjemvannet (0.37 km2), which was the largest lake in Andebu. Parts of Goksjø Lake was also located in Andebu, while minor lakes are Ilestadvannet and Åletjønn, both located near the village of Høyjord.

Brånafjell at 399 meters above sea level is the tallest mountain peak in the former municipality of Andebu, and currently the highest peak in Sandefjord municipality. It is located in northernmost Andebu on the border to Re, and just two kilometers from Lardal. Parking for mountain hiking trails can be found by Trollsvann.

Nature preserves include Veggemyra (marsh), Nordre Skarsholttjønn (marsh), Dalaåsen (birch forest), and Flisefyr-Hidalen (forest).

Andebu Church 

Andebu Church (Andebu kirke) dates from ca. 1100. The church was first mentioned in a diploma from 1314. The edifice is of stone and has 300 seats. The soapstone baptismal font is from the 1100s. The altarpiece and the pulpit are in Renaissance style and date from about 1650. The images of the altarpiece shows events from the crucifixion of Jesus. The church was extensively restored in 1686.  The ridge turret was destroyed in a storm in 1701 and had to be rebuilt. The two church bells were cast by O. Olsen & Son in 1874.  The pipe organ from 1909, was replaced during the 1970s.

Recreation 

Heisetra is a cabin owned by Sandefjord Tourist Association which lies by Heivannet Lake and Svartåa River. 100 km of marked hiking trails are located near the cabin. The trails are used by cross-country skiers, bicyclists, hikers, and equestrians. Heisetra is situated in western Andebu near the border to the municipality of Larvik. A nature trail with interactive signs detailing local nature is located near the lake Heivannet. The lake is used for paddling, kayaking, swimming, and fishing. Nearby trails are used for hiking, skiing, mountain biking, horseback riding, and collection of mushrooms and berries. The 100 km trail network from the cabin leads as far as Hardangervidda, while shorter trails include those leading to Grevesteinen and Sliradammen. The 9.7 km Svartåa culture trail was previously used for the movement of logs to Larvik. This trail has various interactive signs describing the river’s cultural and historical significance, including signs near the Hansekanal, a canal created by Hans Anders Dahl in 1950.

Andebu is home to numerous gravel trails, for instance located by Snappen, Trolldalen, and Vidaråsen. Parking for Snappen can be found nearby Heisetra cabin, along with a variety of other forest- and mountain hikes. It can be reached by driving to Pipenholt, which lies along county road 210 between Kodal and Åsrum in Larvik. From Pipenholt, drive towards Hvitstein. Heiaveien goes through an agricultural landscape and passes by Geirastadir.

Andebu's highest mountain, Brånafjell, is the tallest mountain in Sandefjord municipality at 399 meters. It is located in northernmost Andebu, on the border to Re, and just two kilometers from Lardal (Larvik). The trail to the mountain can be found by Trollsvann Lake. Trollsvann is located on the border with Lardal and is surrounded by tall hillsides. A trail, Trollstien, follows the lake on its western side. A number of trailheads can be found near the cabin Trollsvannstua, a cabin owned by the Norwegian Trekking Association. Trails from Trollsvannstua lead as far as to Merkedammen Lake in Re and westwards to Åletjønn Lake. There are also trails leading as far as Brånafjell, the tallest mountain in Andebu. There are also trails leading to the waterfall Løkedalsfossen in Lardal.

Another mountain trail leads to the peak and tower at Vetan, a 1.5 km hike from the village centre in Andebu. From the village centre, follow Kodalveien to Familiesenteret. From there, make a right and follow the gravel Møylandsveien over the farm fields. Before the farm, the trail winds left into the woodlands. Interpretive signs can be found throughout the trail, which describe the area's species of wildlife and flora. The peak has an elevation of 180 meters and the house on top was originally a lookout tower meant to be used in times of war. An overlook tower was constructed at Vetan in 1988, which provides panoramic views of Tønsberg Fortress, the Oslo Fjord, Gaustatoppen and Skrim. Parking for the trail to Vetan is located by the kindergarten Møyland, immediately west of Andebu village center.

Andebu is home to 35 lakes, where fishing is permitted in 16 lakes. The largest rivers are Svartåa and Skorgeelva.

Points of interest 

 Høyjord Stave Church, only stave church left in Vestfold County.
 Heisetra, cabin owned by Sandefjord Tourist Association, adjacent to combined 100 km of hiking trails.
 Andebu Church, largest Medieval church in Sandefjord municipality.
 Goksjø Lake (part), third-largest lake in Vestfold County.
 Svartåa River, one of Andebu's largest rivers, popular fishing river.
 Brånafjell, tallest mountain in Sandefjord municipality.

Notable people 
 Kaare Reitan (1903–2000), orthodontist

References

Literature

External links 
 
 
 Municipal fact sheet from Statistics Norway
 

 
Sandefjord
Villages in Vestfold og Telemark